Dazai Osamu (June 19, 1909 – June 13, 1948)
Dan Kazuo
Dan Oniroku

D